Naïve. Super. (Original title: Naiv.Super.) is a novel by the Norwegian author Erlend Loe. It was first published in 1996 in Norwegian, and proved to be very popular. In 2006, it was on the newspaper Dagbladets list of the best Norwegian novels 1981–2006. The novel has since been translated into more than 30 other languages.  Tor Ketil Solberg translated the novel into English.

Plot synopsis
The story is narrated by a man in his mid-twenties who suddenly becomes disillusioned and confused by life and therefore quits university. The narrator becomes fascinated by both modern scientific theories of time and relativity. He reads a book by Paul Davies, exchanges faxes with his meteorologist friend Kim, and also engages in repetitive childish activities such as playing with wooden BRIO children's toys and repeatedly throwing a ball against a wall. In the end, the narrator visits his brother in New York City and returns to Norway with a renewed sense of meaning in life.

While the narrator's name remains unknown throughout the novel, the author uses his own name at the end of the book, raising questions about the true narrative standpoint throughout the text.

Chapters
The novel is broken up into 45 chapters, each approximately 4-5 pages in length.

References

1996 Norwegian novels
20th-century Norwegian novels
Books by Erlend Loe
Novels set in Norway
Philosophical novels